Beji, Béji or Bejī may refer to the following:

Places
Beji, a subdistrict in Indonesia
Bejī Kolā, an alternate name for Biji Kola, a village in Iran

Food
 Beji (cookie), an Iranian confectionery

People

Given name
Beji Caid Essebsi (1926  – 2019), Tunisian politician
Beji Anthony (born 1999), Nigerian footballer

Surname
Hélé Béji (born 1948), Tunisian writer
Ghazi Beji, a Tunisian convict

See also
Bejís, a municipality in Spain
Pura Beji Sangsit